Eino Tukiainen (1 January 1915 in Vyborg – 2 February 1975 in Helsinki) was a Finnish gymnast who competed in the 1936 Summer Olympics.

References

1915 births
1975 deaths
Sportspeople from Vyborg
People from Viipuri Province (Grand Duchy of Finland)
Finnish male artistic gymnasts
Olympic gymnasts of Finland
Gymnasts at the 1936 Summer Olympics
Olympic bronze medalists for Finland
Olympic medalists in gymnastics
Medalists at the 1936 Summer Olympics
20th-century Finnish people